Gail Allan (born 1965) is a former British slalom canoeist who competed in the 1980s. She won two bronze medals at the 1985 ICF Canoe Slalom World Championships in Augsburg, earning them in the K-1 event and the K-1 team event. Her name is now (2010) Gail King, she lives in Guernsey and competes in Triathlon and Quadrathlon.

References

British female canoeists

Medalists at the ICF Canoe Slalom World Championships

Living people

1965 births
Place of birth missing (living people)